Sweeney Todd: The Demon Barber of Fleet Street (often referred to simply as Sweeney Todd) is a musical with music and lyrics by Stephen Sondheim and a book by Hugh Wheeler. It is based on the 1970 play of the same name by Christopher Bond. The character of Sweeney Todd first appeared in a Victorian penny dreadful titled The String of Pearls (1846-7). 

Sweeney Todd opened on Broadway in 1979 and in the West End in 1980. It won the Tony Award for Best Musical and Olivier Award for Best New Musical. It has been revived in many productions as well as inspiring a film adaptation.

The original logo for the musical is a modified version of an advertising image from the 19th century, with the sign replaced by a straight razor. There is also a woman wearing a blood-stained dress and holding a rolling pin next to the man.

Background
The character Sweeney Todd originated in serialized Victorian popular fiction, known as penny dreadfuls. A story called The String of Pearls was published in a weekly magazine during the winter of 1846–47. Set in 1785, the story featured as its principal villain a certain Sweeney Todd and included all the plot elements used in later versions. The murderous barber's story was turned into a play before the ending had even been revealed in print. An expanded edition appeared in 1850, an American version in 1852, a new play in 1865. By the 1870s, Sweeney Todd was a familiar character to most Victorians.

The musical was based on Christopher Bond's 1973 play Sweeney Todd, which introduced a psychological backstory and motivation to Todd's crimes. In Bond's reincarnation of the character, Todd was the victim of a ruthless judge, who exiled him to Australia and raped his young wife, driving her mad. Stephen Sondheim first conceived of a musical version of the story in 1973, after he saw Bond's take on the story at Theatre Royal Stratford East.

Bond's sophisticated plot and language significantly elevated the lurid nature of the tale. Sondheim once observed, “It had a weight to it ... because [Bond] wrote certain characters in blank verse. He also infused into it plot elements from Jacobean tragedy and The Count of Monte Cristo. He was able to take all these disparate elements that had been in existence rather dully for a hundred and some-odd years and make them into a first-rate play.”

Sondheim felt that the addition of music would greatly increase the size of the drama, transforming it into a different theatrical experience, saying later:What I did to Chris' play is more than enhance it. I had a feeling it would be a new animal. The effect it had at Stratford East in London and the effect it had at the Uris Theater in New York are two entirely different effects, even though it's the same play. It was essentially charming over there because they don't take Sweeney Todd seriously. Our production was larger in scope. Hal Prince gave it an epic sense, a sense that this was a man of some size instead of just a nut case. The music helps to give it that dimension.Music proved to be a key element behind the impact of Sweeney Todd on audiences. Over eighty percent of the production is set to music, either sung or underscoring dialogue. The score is one vast structure, each individual part meshing with others for the good of the entire musical machine. Never before or later in his work did Sondheim utilize music in such an exhaustive capacity to further the purposes of the drama.

Sondheim decided to pair one of the most nightmarish songs (Sweeney Todd's "Epiphany") with the comic-relief of "A Little Priest". This pair of songs at the end of Act I was the most significant musical addition which Sondheim made to Bond's version of the story. In the play, Sweeney Todd's mental collapse and the subsequent plan for Lovett's meat pies take place in less than half a page of dialogue, much too quickly to convey the full psychological impact, in the view of scholar Larry A. Brown. Sondheim's version more carefully reveals the developing ideas in Sweeney Todd and Mrs. Lovett's demented minds.

Sondheim has often said that his Sweeney Todd was about obsession – and close friends seemed to instinctually agree. When Sondheim first played songs from an early version of the show for Judy Prince (wife of the show's director), she told him: "Oh God – I didn't know this was what [Sweeney Todd] was about. It's nothing to do with Grand Guignol. It's the story of your [own] life."

When Sondheim first brought the idea for the show to director Harold Prince, his frequent collaborator, Prince was uninterested, feeling it was a simple melodrama that wasn't very experimental structurally. However, Prince soon discovered a metaphor in which to set the show, making what Sondheim had originally envisioned as "a small horror piece" into a colossal portrait of the Industrial Revolution, and an examination of the general human condition of the time as it related to men like Sweeney Todd. Said Sondheim, "Hal's metaphor is that the factory turns out Sweeney Todds. It turns out soulless, defeated, hopeless people. That's what the play's about to him; Sweeney Todd is a product of that age. I think it's not. Sweeney Todd is a man bent on personal revenge, the way we all are in one way or another, and it has nothing whatsoever to do with the time he lived in, as far as I'm concerned.” However, Sondheim accepted Prince's vision as a different way to do the show, and as an opportunity to do the show on a large scale, knowing that small-scale productions could be done at any time.

On the stage of the Uris Theater in New York, this tale of horrors was transformed into a mountain of steel in motion. Prince's scenic metaphor for Sweeney Todd was a 19th-century iron foundry moved from Rhode Island and reassembled on the stage, which critic Jack Kroll aptly described as "part cathedral, part factory, part prison, that dwarfed and degraded the swarming denizens of the lower orders."

When it came to casting, Sondheim thought stage veteran Angela Lansbury would add some needed comedy to the grim tale as the lunatic Cockney shopkeeper, but Lansbury needed to be convinced. She was a star and, as she pointed out to Sondheim, "Your show is not called 'Nellie Lovett', it's called 'Sweeney Todd'. And I'm the second banana." To convince her, Sondheim "auditioned," writing a couple of songs for her, including the macabre patter song, "A Little Priest." And he gave her the key to the character, saying "I want Mrs. Lovett to have a music hall character." Lansbury, who had grown up in British music hall, immediately got it. "Not just music hall ... but dotty music hall", as she put it. After she was formally confirmed in the role, she relished the opportunity, saying that she loved "the extraordinary wit and intelligence of [Sondheim's] lyrics."

Canadian actor and singer Len Cariou was Sondheim's personal choice to play the tortured barber. In preparation for the role, Cariou (who was studying with a voice teacher at the time) asked Sondheim what kind of range he needed to have in the role. Cariou told him he was prepared to give Sondheim a couple of octaves to deal with, and Sondheim immediately replied, "That would be more than sufficient."

With Prince absorbed in staging the mammoth production, Lansbury and Cariou were left largely to their own when it came to developing their characters. They worked together on all their scenes, both of them creative actors who were experienced in giving intense performances. "That cuckoo style of playing Mrs. Lovett, that was pretty much Angela ... She invented that character", Cariou said. She recalled, "I just ran with it. The wide-openness of my portrayal had to do with my sink or swim attitude toward it. I just figured hell, I've done everything else on Broadway, I might as well go with Mrs. Lovett."

It is said that on opening night Harold Clurman, the doyen of American theatre critics, rushed up to Schuyler Chapin, former general manager of the Metropolitan Opera, demanding to know why he had not put it on at the Met. To which Chapin replied: "I would have put it on like a shot if I'd had the opportunity. There would have been screams and yells but I wouldn't have given a damn. Because it is an opera. A modern American opera."

Synopsis

The citizens of London, who act as a Greek chorus throughout the play, drop a body bag and pour ashes into a shallow grave. Sweeney Todd rises forth ("The Ballad of Sweeney Todd"), and introduces the drama.

Act I
In 1846, young sailor Anthony Hope and the mysterious Sweeney Todd, whom Anthony has recently rescued at sea and befriended, dock in London. A beggar woman sexually solicits them, appearing to recognize Todd for a moment ("No Place Like London"), and Todd shoos her away. Todd obliquely relates some of his troubled past to Anthony: he was a naïve barber, "removed...from his plate" by a corrupt judge who lusted after Todd's wife ("The Barber and His Wife"). Leaving Anthony, Todd enters a meat pie shop on Fleet Street, where the owner, the slatternly widow Mrs. Lovett, laments the scarcity of meat and customers ("Worst Pies in London"). When Todd asks after the empty upstairs apartment, she reveals that its former tenant, Benjamin Barker, was transported for life based on false charges by Judge Turpin, who, along with his servant, Beadle Bamford, then lured Barker's wife Lucy to a masked ball at the Judge's home and raped her ("Poor Thing").

Todd's reaction reveals that he is himself Benjamin Barker. Promising to keep his secret, Mrs. Lovett explains that Lucy poisoned herself with arsenic and that their then-infant daughter, Johanna, became the Judge's ward. Todd swears revenge on the Judge and the Beadle, and Mrs. Lovett presents Todd with his old collection of sterling silver straight razors, which persuades Todd to take up his old profession ("My Friends" and "The Ballad of Sweeney Todd" – reprise). Elsewhere, Anthony spies a beautiful girl singing at her window ("Green Finch and Linnet Bird"), and the beggar woman tells him that her name is Johanna. Unaware that Johanna is his friend Todd's daughter, Anthony is immediately enamored ("Ah, Miss"), and he pledges to return for her, even after the judge and the Beadle threaten him and chase him away ("Johanna").

In the crowded London marketplace, flamboyant Italian barber Adolfo Pirelli and his simple-minded young assistant Tobias Ragg pitch a dramatic cure-all for hair loss ("Pirelli's Miracle Elixir"). Todd and Lovett soon arrive; as part of his plan to establish his new identity, Todd exposes the elixir as a sham, challenges Pirelli to a shaving competition and easily wins ("The Contest"), inviting the impressed Beadle for a free shave ("The Ballad of Sweeney Todd" – reprise 2). Several days later, Judge Turpin flagellates himself in a frenzy over a growing lust for Johanna, but instead resolves to marry her himself ("Johanna – Mea Culpa").

Todd awaits the Beadle's arrival with mounting impatience, but Mrs. Lovett tries to soothe him ("Wait"). When Anthony tells Todd of his plan to ask Johanna to elope with him, Todd, eager to reunite with his daughter, agrees to let them use his barbershop as a safehouse. As Anthony leaves, Pirelli and Tobias enter, and Mrs. Lovett takes Toby downstairs for a pie. Alone with Todd, Pirelli drops his Italian accent and reveals that he is really Daniel O'Higgins, Benjamin Barker's former assistant. He knows Todd's true identity (having recognized Barker's illustrious shaving tools during their earlier competition) and demands half his income for life. (In the film, the name is not Daniel O'Higgins but "Davy Collins".) Todd kills O'Higgins by slitting his throat ("Pirelli's Death" and "The Ballad of Sweeney Todd" – reprise 3) and temporarily hides his body. Meanwhile, Johanna and Anthony plan their elopement ("Kiss Me"), while the Beadle recommends Todd's grooming services to the Judge so that the judge may better win Johanna's affections ("Ladies in Their Sensitivities").

Panicked at first on learning of Pirelli's murder, Mrs. Lovett swipes his leftover coin purse and then asks Todd how he plans to dispose of the body. Suddenly, the judge enters; Todd quickly seats him and lulls him with a relaxing conversation ("Pretty Women"). Before Todd can kill the judge, however, Anthony re-enters and blurts out his elopement plan. The angry judge storms out, vowing never to return and to send Johanna away. Todd drives Anthony out in a fit of fury and, reminded of the evil he sees in London, resolves to depopulate the city by murdering his future customers since all people deserve to die: the rich to be punished for their corruption, and the poor to be relieved of their misery ("Epiphany"). While discussing how to dispose of Pirelli's body, Mrs. Lovett is struck by a sudden idea and suggests that they use the bodies of Todd's victims in her meat pies, and Todd happily agrees ("A Little Priest").

Act II
Several weeks later, Mrs. Lovett's pie shop has become a successful business, and Toby works there as a waiter. The food is very popular ("God, That's Good!"). Todd has acquired a special mechanical barber's chair that allows him to kill clients and then send their bodies directly through a chute into the pie shop's basement bakehouse. Casually slitting his customers' necks, Todd despairs of ever seeing Johanna, while Anthony searches London for her ("Johanna – Quartet"). Anthony finds Johanna locked away in a private lunatic asylum, but barely escapes being placed under arrest by the Beadle. After a day of hard work, while Todd remains fixated on his revenge, Mrs. Lovett envisions a seaside retirement ("By the Sea"). Anthony arrives to beg Todd for help to free Johanna, and Todd, revitalized, instructs Anthony to rescue her by posing as a wigmaker intent on purchasing inmates' hair ("Wigmaker Sequence" and "The Ballad..." – reprise 4). However, once Anthony has departed, Todd sends a letter informing the Judge that Anthony will bring Johanna to his shop just after dark, and that he will hand her over ("The Letter") in order to lure him back to the shop.

In the pie shop, Toby tells Mrs. Lovett of his skepticism about Todd and his own desire to protect her ("Not While I'm Around"). When he recognizes Pirelli's coin purse in Mrs. Lovett's hands, she distracts him by showing him the bakehouse, instructing him how to work the meat grinder and the oven before locking him in. Upstairs, she encounters the Beadle at her harmonium; he has been asked by Lovett's neighbors to investigate the strange smoke and stench from the pie shop's chimney. Mrs. Lovett stalls the Beadle with "Parlor Songs" until Todd returns to offer the Beadle his promised "free shave"; Mrs. Lovett loudly plays her harmonium to cover the Beadle's screams above as Todd dispatches him. In the basement, Toby discovers hair and fingernails in a pie he has been eating, just as the Beadle's fresh corpse comes tumbling through the chute. Terrified, he flees into the sewers below the bakehouse. Mrs. Lovett then informs Todd that Toby has found out about their secret and they plot to kill him.

Anthony arrives at the asylum to rescue Johanna, but is exposed when Johanna recognizes him. Anthony draws a pistol given to him by Todd, but cannot bring himself to shoot Jonas Fogg, the corrupt asylum owner; Johanna grabs the pistol and kills Fogg. As Anthony and Johanna flee, the asylum's freed inmates prophesy the end of the world, while Todd and Mrs. Lovett hunt through the sewers for Toby, and the beggar woman fears what has become of the Beadle ("City on Fire/Searching").

Anthony and Johanna (now disguised as a sailor) arrive at Todd's empty shop. Anthony leaves to seek a coach after he and Johanna reaffirm their love ("Ah Miss" – reprise). Johanna hears the beggar woman entering and hides in a trunk in the barbershop. The beggar woman seems to recognize the room. Todd enters and tries to force her to leave as she again seems to recognize him ("Beggar Woman's Lullaby"). Hearing the Judge outside, a frantic Todd kills the beggar woman, sending her body down the chute barely a moment before the Judge bursts in. Todd assures the Judge that Johanna is repentant, and the judge asks for a quick splash of cologne.

Once he has the Judge in his chair, Todd soothes him with another conversation on women, but this time he alludes to their "fellow tastes, in women at least". The Judge recognizes him as "Benjamin Barker!" just before Todd slashes his throat and sends him hurtling down the chute ("The Judge's Return"). Remembering Toby, Todd starts to leave, but, realizing he has left his razor behind, returns just as the disguised Johanna rises, horrified, from the trunk. Not recognizing her, Todd attempts to kill her, just as Mrs. Lovett shrieks from the bakehouse below, providing a distraction for Johanna to escape. Downstairs, Mrs. Lovett is struggling with the dying Judge, who claws at her. She then attempts to drag the beggar woman's body into the oven, but Todd arrives and, through a shaft of light, sees the lifeless face clearly for the first time: the beggar woman was his wife Lucy. Horrified, Todd accuses Mrs. Lovett of lying to him. Mrs. Lovett frantically denies it, explaining that Lucy did indeed poison herself, but lived, although the attempt left her insane. Mrs. Lovett then tells Todd she loves him and would be a better wife than Lucy ever could have been. Todd feigns forgiveness, dancing manically with Mrs. Lovett until he hurls her into the oven, burning her alive. Full of despair and in shock, Todd embraces the dead Lucy. Toby, now insane and his hair turned white, crawls up from the sewer babbling nursery rhymes to himself. He picks up Todd's fallen razor and slits Todd's throat. As Todd falls dead and Toby drops the razor, Anthony, Johanna and some others break into the bakehouse. Toby, heedless of them, begins turning the meat grinder, crooning Mrs. Lovett's previous instructions to him ("Final Scene").

Epilogue
The ensemble cast, soon joined by the risen Todd and Mrs. Lovett, sing a final reprise of "The Ballad of Sweeney Todd" warning against revenge (though admitting that "everyone does it"). Tearing off their costumes, the company exits. Todd sneers at the audience for a moment and vanishes.

Musical numbers

 Prologue
 "Prelude: The Ballad of Sweeney Todd: 'Attend The Tale Of Sweeney Todd...'" – Full Cast
 Act I
 "No Place Like London" – Anthony, Todd, Beggar Woman
 "The Barber and His Wife" – Todd
 "The Worst Pies in London" – Mrs. Lovett
 "Poor Thing" – Mrs. Lovett
 "My Friends" – Todd and Mrs. Lovett
 "The Ballad Of Sweeney Todd: '...Lift Your Razor High, Sweeney!' (Reprise 1)" – Company, Judge, Beadle
 "Green Finch and Linnet Bird" – Johanna
 "Ah, Miss" – Anthony, Johanna, Beggar Woman
 "Johanna" – Anthony
 "Pirelli's Miracle Elixir" – Tobias, Todd, Mrs. Lovett, Crowd
 "The Contest (Part 1): Shaving Scene" – Pirelli
 "The Contest (Part 2): Tooth-Pulling Scene" † – Pirelli, Tobias
 "The Ballad Of Sweeney Todd: '...Sweeney Pondered and Sweeney Planned...' (Reprise 2)" – Company, Beggar Woman
 "Wait" – Lovett
 "Pirelli's Death" – Pirelli
 "The Ballad Of Sweeney Todd: '...His Hands Were Quick, His Fingers Strong...' (Reprise 3)" – Tenor Trio
 "Johanna (Mea Culpa)" †‡ – Judge Turpin
 "Kiss Me" – Johanna, Anthony
 "Ladies In Their Sensitivities"/"Kiss Me (Quartet)" – Beadle, Johanna, Anthony, Judge Turpin
 "Pretty Women" – Judge, Todd, Anthony
 "Epiphany" – Todd, Lovett
 "A Little Priest" – Todd, Lovett

 Act II
 "God, That's Good!" – Tobias, Mrs. Lovett, Todd, Customers
 "Johanna (Quartet)" – Anthony, Todd, Beggar Woman, Johanna
 "I Am A Lass" € – Mrs. Lovett
 "By The Sea" – Mrs. Lovett and Todd
 "Wigmaker Sequence"/"The Ballad Of Sweeney Todd: '...Sweeney'd Waited Too Long Before...' (Reprise 4)"/"The Letter" – Todd, Anthony, Quintet
 "Not While I'm Around" – Tobias, Mrs. Lovett
 "Parlour Songs (Part 1): Sweet Polly Plunkett" – Beadle
 "Parlour Songs (Part 2): The 12 Bells In Tower of Bray" – Beadle, Lovett, Tobias †
 "Parlour Songs (Part 3): Sweet Polly Plunkett (Reprise)" – Lovett
 "Final Sequence":
 "The Ballad Of Sweeney Todd: '...The Engine Roared, The Motor Hissed...' (Reprise 5)"/"Fogg's Asylum"/"City On Fire"/"Searching"/"Ah, Miss (Reprise)"/"Beggar Woman's Lullaby" § / "The Judge's Return" / "The Ballad Of Sweeney Todd: '...Lift Your Razor High, Sweeney...' (Reprise 6)"/"Final Scene" – Lunatics, Johanna, Beggar Woman, Lovett, Todd, Anthony, Judge Turpin, Chorus, Tobias

 Epilogue
 "The Ballad of Sweeney Todd: '...Attend The Tale Of Sweeney Todd...' (Reprise 7)" – Company, Todd, Lovett (Full Cast)

Notes on the songs:

 † Despite being cut in previews for reasons of length, these numbers were included on the Original Cast Recording. They have been restored in subsequent productions.
 ‡ This song was moved to after "The Ballad of Sweeney Todd (Reprise 3)" in the 2000 and 2014 New York Philharmonic concert performances, and on the Original Broadway Cast Album.
 § This number was written for the original London production and first recorded for the 2000 New York Philharmonic concert performance.
 € This song is an optional verse of "Sweet Polly Plunkett."
 The song "The Ballad of Sweeney Todd" and its multiple reprises are titled in some productions by their first lyrics to differentiate them from one another:

 "The Ballad of Sweeney Todd: Attend the Tale of Sweeney Todd"
 "The Ballad of Sweeney Todd (Reprise): Lift Your Razor High, Sweeney"
 "The Ballad of Sweeney Todd (Reprise 2): Sweeney Pondered and Sweeney Planned"
 "The Ballad of Sweeney Todd (Reprise 3): His Hands Were Quick, His Fingers Strong"
 "The Ballad of Sweeney Todd (Reprise 4): Sweeney'd Waited Too Long Before"
 "The Ballad of Sweeney Todd (Reprise 5): The Engine Roared, The Motor Hissed"
 "The Ballad of Sweeney Todd (Reprise 6): Lift Your Razor High, Sweeney"
 "The Ballad of Sweeney Todd (Reprise 7): Attend the Tale of Sweeney Todd"

 Sources: SondheimGuide.com & InternetBroadwayDatabase

Principal roles

Casts

Original casts

Notable replacements 
Broadway (1979–80)
Sweeney Todd: George Hearn, Walter Charles (u/s)
Mrs. Lovett: Dorothy Loudon, Denise Lor (u/s), Marge Redmond (u/s)
Anthony Hope: Cris Groenendaal
Johanna Barker: Betsy Joslyn

West End (1980)
Sweeney Todd: Oz Clarke (u/s)

First National Tour (1980-81)
Sweeney Todd: Walter Charles (u/s)
Mrs. Lovett: Denise Lor (u/s)
Judge Turpin: Walter Charles (u/s)

Broadway Revival (2005–06)
Mrs. Lovett: Judy Kaye

Third National Tour (2007-08)
Sweeney Todd: Alexander Gemignani

Off-Broadway Revival (2017–18)
Sweeney Todd: Norm Lewis, Hugh Panaro
Mrs. Lovett: Carolee Carmello, Sally Ann Triplett
Anthony Hope: Matt Leisy (u/s)
Judge Turpin: Jamie Jackson
Tobias Ragg: Matt Leisy (u/s)
Beadle Bamford: Matt Leisy

Concert casts

Additional performers 
Sweeney Todd: Steve Barton, Kevin Earley, Gregg Edelman, Davis Gaines, Rod Gilfry, Nathan Gunn, Tom Hewitt, Jamie Jackson, Mark Jacoby, Terrence Mann, Hugh Maynard, Michael McCarthy, Brian Stokes Mitchell, Brian Mulligan, Timothy Nolan, Jonathan Roxmouth, David Thaxton, Anthony Warlow, Dave Willetts, Tom Wopat
Mrs. Lovett: Becky Ann Baker, Stephanie Blythe, Joyce Castle, Donna Lynne Champlin, Carmen Cusack, Sophie-Louise Dann, Annie Golden, Liz Larsen, Sarah Litzsinger, Caroline O'Connor, Elaine Paige, Faith Prince, Lea Salonga
Anthony Hope: Hugh Panaro, Max von Essen
Johanna Barker: Celia Keenan-Bolger, Alice Ripley
Judge Turpin: Walter Charles, Robert Cuccioli, Ed Dixon, Henk Poort
Tobias: Åsleik Engmark
Beadle Bamford: Bill Nolte, Jimmy Smagula, Stephen Wallem
The Beggar Woman: Andréa Burns, Debra Byrne, Mary Beth Peil, Dianne Pilkington

Productions

Original Broadway production
The original production premiered on Broadway at the Uris Theatre on March 1, 1979 and closed on June 29, 1980 after 557 performances and 19 previews. Directed by Hal Prince and choreographed by Larry Fuller, the scenic design was by Eugene Lee, costumes by Franne Lee and lighting by Ken Billington. The cast included Angela Lansbury as Mrs. Lovett, Len Cariou as Todd, Victor Garber as Anthony, Sarah Rice as Johanna, Merle Louise as the Beggar Woman, Ken Jennings as Tobias, Edmund Lyndeck as Judge Turpin, Joaquin Romaguera as Pirelli, and Jack Eric Williams as Beadle Bamford. The production was nominated for nine Tony Awards, winning eight including Best Musical. Dorothy Loudon and George Hearn replaced Lansbury and Cariou on March 4, 1980.

Tour and filmed production 
The first national U.S. tour started on October 24, 1980, in Washington, D.C. and ended in August 1981 in Los Angeles, California. Lansbury was joined by Hearn and this version was taped during the Los Angeles engagement and broadcast on The Entertainment Channel (one of the predecessors of today's A&E) on September 12, 1982. This performance would later be repeated on Showtime and PBS (the latter as part of its Great Performances series); It was later released on home video through Turner Home Entertainment, and on DVD from Warner Home Video. The taped production was nominated for five Primetime Emmy Awards in 1985, winning three including Outstanding Individual Performance in a Variety or Music Program (for George Hearn).

A North American tour started on February 23, 1982, in Wilmington, Delaware, and ended on July 17, 1982, in Toronto, Ontario. June Havoc and Ross Petty starred.

Original London production
The first London production opened on July 2, 1980, at the West End's Theatre Royal, Drury Lane, starring Denis Quilley and Sheila Hancock along with Andrew C. Wadsworth as Anthony, Mandy More as Johanna, Michael Staniforth as Tobias, Austin Kent as Judge Turpin, Dilys Watling as the Beggar Woman, David Wheldon-Williams as Beadle Bamford, Oz Clarke as Jonas Fogg, and John Aron as Pirelli. The show ran for 157 performances. Despite receiving mixed reviews, the production won the Olivier Award for Best New Musical in 1980. The production closed on November 14, 1980.

1989 Broadway revival
The first Broadway revival opened on September 14, 1989 at the Circle in the Square Theatre, and closed on February 25, 1990 after 189 performances and 46 previews. It was produced by Theodore Mann, directed by Susan H. Schulman, with choreography by Michael Lichtefeld. The cast featured Bob Gunton (Sweeney Todd), Beth Fowler (Mrs. Lovett), Eddie Korbich (Tobias Ragg), Jim Walton (Anthony Hope) and David Barron (Judge Turpin). In contrast to the original Broadway version, the production was designed on a relatively intimate scale and was affectionately referred to as "Teeny Todd." It was originally produced Off-Broadway by the York Theatre Company at the Church of the Heavenly Rest from March 31, 1989 to April 29, 1989. This production received four Tony Award nominations: for Best Revival of a Musical, Best Actor in a Musical, Best Actress in a Musical and Best Direction of a Musical, but failed to win any.

1993 London revival
In 1993, the show received its first London revival at the Royal National Theatre. The production opened originally at the Cottesloe Theatre on June 2, 1993, and later transferred to the Lyttleton Theatre on December 16, 1993, playing in repertory and closing on June 1, 1994. The show's design was slightly altered to fit a proscenium arch theatre space for the Lyttleton Theatre. The director was Declan Donnellan and the Cottesloe Theatre production starred Alun Armstrong as Todd and Julia McKenzie as Mrs. Lovett, with Adrian Lester as Anthony, Barry James as Beadle Bamford and Denis Quilley (who had originated the title role in the original London production in 1980) as Judge Turpin. When the show transferred to the Lyttleton, Quilley replaced Armstrong in the title role. Sondheim praised Donnellan for the "small 'chamber' approach to the show, which was the composer's original vision for the piece." This production received Olivier Awards for Best Musical Revival, Best Actor in a Musical (Armstrong) and Best Actress in a Musical (McKenzie), and Best Director Of A Musical for Donnellan. Adrian Lester and Barry James received nominations in the category of Best Supporting Performance In a Musical for their portrayals of Anthony and Beadle Bamford respectively.

2004 London revival
In 2004, John Doyle directed a revival of the musical at the Watermill Theatre in Newbury, England, running from July 27, 2004 until October 9, 2004. This production subsequently transferred to the West End's Trafalgar Studios and then the Ambassadors Theatre. This production was notable for having no orchestra, with the 10-person cast playing the score themselves on musical instruments that they carried onstage. This marked the first time in nearly ten years that a Sondheim show had been presented in the commercial West End. It starred Paul Hegarty as Todd, Karen Mann as Mrs. Lovett, Rebecca Jackson as The Beggar Woman, Sam Kenyon as Tobias, Rebecca Jenkins as Johanna, David Ricardo-Pearce as Anthony and Colin Wakefield as Judge Turpin. This production closed February 5, 2005.

In spring 2006, the production toured the UK with Jason Donovan as Todd and Harriet Thorpe as Mrs. Lovett.

2005 Broadway revival
A version of the John Doyle West End production transferred to Broadway, opening on November 3, 2005 at the Eugene O'Neill Theatre with a new cast, all of whom played their own instruments, as had been done in London. The cast consisted of: Patti LuPone (Mrs. Lovett/Tuba/Percussion), Michael Cerveris (Todd/Guitar), Manoel Felciano (Tobias/Violin/Clarinet/Piano), Alexander Gemignani (Beadle/Piano/Trumpet), Lauren Molina (Johanna/Cello), Benjamin Magnuson (Anthony/Cello/Piano), Mark Jacoby (Turpin/Trumpet/Percussion), Donna Lynne Champlin (Pirelli/Accordion/Flute/Piano), Diana DiMarzio (Beggar Woman/Clarinet) and John Arbo (Fogg/Double bass). The production ran for 349 performances and 35 previews, and was nominated for six Tony Awards, winning two: Best Direction of a Musical for Doyle and Best Orchestrations for Sarah Travis who had reconstructed Jonathan Tunick's original arrangements to suit the ten-person cast and orchestra. Because of the small scale of the musical, it cost $3.5 million to make, a sum small in comparison to many Broadway musicals and recouped in nineteen weeks. A national tour based on Doyle's Broadway production began on August 30, 2007 with Judy Kaye (who had temporarily replaced LuPone in the Broadway run) as Mrs. Lovett and David Hess as Todd. Alexander Gemignani also played the title role for the Toronto run of the tour in November 2007.

2012 West End revival
Michael Ball and Imelda Staunton starred in a new production of the show that played at The Chichester Festival Theatre, running from September 24 to November 5, 2011. Directed by Jonathan Kent, the cast included Ball as Todd, Staunton as Mrs. Lovett, James McConville as Tobias, John Bowe as Judge Turpin, Robert Burt as Pirelli, Luke Brady as Anthony, Gillian Kirkpatrick as Lucy Barker, Lucy May Barker as Johanna and Peter Polycarpou as Beadle Bamford. It was notably set in the 1930s instead of 1846 and restored the oft-cut song "Johanna (Mea Culpa)". The production received positive reviews from both critics and audience members and transferred to the Adelphi Theatre in the West End in 2012 for a limited run from March 10 to September 22, 2012. Comedian Jason Manford made his musical debut as Pirelli from July 2 to 28 and August 15, 18 and 24, 2012 while Robert Burt appeared at Glyndebourne Festival Opera.The West End transfer received six Laurence Olivier Award nominations of which it won the three: Best Musical Revival, Best Actor in a Musical for Ball and Best Actress in a Musical for Staunton.

2015 London and 2017 Off-Broadway revival
Cameron Mackintosh produced the West End transfer of the Tooting Arts Club production of the show which ran at Harrington's Pie Shop in Tooting, London in October and November 2014. This production takes place in a pie shop that has been recreated for the occasion in Shaftesbury Avenue and ran from March 19 to May 16, 2015. The cast included Jeremy Secomb as Sweeney Todd, Siobhán McCarthy as Mrs. Lovett, Nadim Naaman as Anthony, Ian Mowat as the Beadle, Duncan Smith as the Judge, Kiara Jay as Pirelli and the Beggar Woman, Joseph Taylor as Tobias and Zoe Doano as Johanna.

The Tooting Arts Club production transferred to Off-Broadway, transforming the Barrow Street Theatre into a working re-creation of Harrington's pie shop. Previews began February 14, 2017 before officially opening night on March 1. Like the London production, the transfer was directed by Bill Buckhurst, designed by Simon Kenny and produced by Rachel Edwards, Jenny Gersten, Seaview Productions, and Nate Koch, executive producer, in association with Barrow Street Theatre. The opening night cast featured four members of the London cast: Jeremy Secomb as Sweeney Todd, Siobhan McCarthy as Mrs. Lovett, Duncan Smith as the Judge and, Joseph Taylor as Tobias, alongside Brad Oscar as the Beadle, Betsy Morgan as Pirelli and the Beggar Woman, Matt Doyle as Anthony and Alex Finke as Johanna. In April 2017, five of the cast members left the show, replaced by Norm Lewis as Sweeney Todd, Carolee Carmello as Mrs. Lovett, John-Michael Lyles as Tobias, Stacie Bono as The Beggar Woman and Pirelli, and Jamie Jackson as Judge Turpin. After Norm Lewis left, he was replaced by Hugh Panaro in the titular role. In February 2018, Panaro and Carmello were replaced by Thom Sema and Sally Ann Triplett, respectively. Other changes included Michael James Leslie as Judge Turpin and Zachary Noah Piser as Tobias. The production was extended and closed on August 26, 2018.

2023 Broadway revival
The musical began previews on February 26 and has an opening night set for March 26, 2023 at the Lunt-Fontanne Theatre, starring Josh Groban as Todd, Annaleigh Ashford as Mrs. Lovett, Jordan Fisher as Anthony, Gaten Matarazzo as Tobias, Jamie Jackson reprising his role as Judge Turpin, Ruthie Ann Miles as the Beggarwoman, and Nicholas Christopher as Pirelli and the understudy for Todd. The production is directed by Thomas Kail, with orchestrations by Jonathan Tunick, musical supervision by Alex Lacamoire and choreography by Steven Hoggett. 

The production began a workshop three days after Sondheim's death who had been planning to attend the workshop's final day. It was revealed that the production has a budget of $14 million dollars with a cast of 26 and an orchestra of 27. It was also confirmed that the production remains set in the 19th century.

Other notable productions

1987 Australian productions 
The State Opera of South Australia presented Australia's first professional production in Adelaide in September 1987. Directed by Gale Edwards, it featured Lyndon Terracini as Todd, Nancye Hayes as Mrs. Lovett and Peter Cousens as Anthony. The following month, Melbourne Theatre Company's version opened at the Playhouse in Melbourne, directed by Roger Hodgman with Peter Carroll as Sweeney Todd, Geraldine Turner as Mrs. Lovett and Jon Ewing as Judge Turpin. The Melbourne production toured to Sydney and Brisbane in 1988.

1992 Budapest production 
The musical was premiered on June 5, 1992 at the Erkel Theater in Budapest, Hungary. The play was translated into Hungarian by Tibor Miklós and György Dénes. The cast consisted of Lajos Miller as Sweeney Todd, Zsuzsa Lehoczky as Mrs. Lovett, Sándor Sasvári as Anthony, Mónika Vásári as Johanna, Róbert Rátonyi as Judge Turpin, Tibor Oláh as Tobias, Péter Kocsmáros as Pirelli, Ildikó Kishonti as Lucy/Beggar woman, and István Rozsos as Beadle Bamford.

1994 Los Angeles revival
In 1994, East West Players in Los Angeles staged a revival of the show directed by Tim Dang, featuring a largely Asian Pacific American cast. It was also the first time the show had been presented in an intimate house (Equity 99-seat). The production received 5 Ovation Awards including the Franklin Levy Award for Best Musical (Smaller Theatre) and Best Director (Musical) for Dang.

1995 Barcelona production
On April 5, 1995 it premiered in Catalan at the theater Poliorama of Barcelona (later moving to the Apollo), in a production of the Drama Centre of the Government of Catalonia. The libretto was adapted by Roser Batalla Roger Pena, and was directed by Mario Gas. The cast consisted of Constantino Romero as Sweeney Todd, Vicky Peña as Mrs. Lovett, Maria Josep Peris as Johanna, Muntsa Rius as Tobias, Pep Molina as Anthony, Xavier Ribera-Vall as Judge Turpin & Teresa Vallicrosa as The Beggar Woman. With critical acclaim and audience applause (Sondheim traveled to Barcelona after hearing the success it was having and was delighted with the production), it later moved to Madrid. The show received over fifteen awards.

1997 Finnish National Opera, Helsinki
The 1997 Finnish National Opera production premiered on September 19, 1997.
Directed by Staffan Aspegren and starting Sauli Tiilikainen (Sweeney Todd) and Ritva Auvinen (Mrs. Lovett). Translated by Juice Leskinen

2002 Kennedy Center production
As part of the Kennedy Center Sondheim Celebration, Sweeney Todd ran from May 10, 2002 through June 30, 2002 at the Eisenhower Theatre, starring Brian Stokes Mitchell as Sweeney Todd, Christine Baranski as Mrs. Lovett, Hugh Panaro as Anthony, Walter Charles (a member of the original cast), as Judge Turpin, Celia Keenan-Bolger as Johanna, Mary Beth Peil as The Beggar Woman, Mark Price as Tobias Ragg, Ray Friedeck as Beadle Bamford and Kevin Ligon as Pirelli. It was directed by Christopher Ashley with choreography by Daniel Pelzig.

2007 Dublin production
Irish tenor David Shannon starred as Todd in a highly successful Dublin production of the show at the Gate Theatre, which ran from April 2007 through June 2007. The production employed a minimalistic approach: the cast consisted of a small ensemble of 14 performers, and the orchestra was a seven-piece band. The look of the production was quite abstract. The Sunday Times wrote that "The black backdrop of David Farley's rough hewn set and the stark minimalism of Rick Fisher's lighting suggest a self-conscious edginess, with Shannon's stylised make-up, long leather coat and brooding countenance only adding to the feeling." When a character died, flour was poured over them.

2008 Gothenburg production
The 2008 Gothenburg production premiered on May 15, 2008 at The Göteborg Opera. The show was a collaboration with West End International Ltd. The cast featured Michael McCarthy as Sweeney Todd and Rosemary Ashe as Mrs Lovett and David Shannon this time as Anthony. The show did a four-week run and ended on June 8, 2008.

2009 U.K. and Irish Tour

In 2009, Sweeney Todd embarked upon an equity tour of the U.K. and Ireland. The production was eager to disassociate itself with recent West End backlash regarding Stunt Casting and so the tour was cast through an open call audition process. Whilst it remained unclear if the casting of predominantly unknown actors helped the tour, the production was applauded for its use of emerging performers and played to almost exclusively sold-out venues.

The tour ran for 8 months, starring Barry Howell as Sweeney Todd & Isabell Wyer as Ms. Lovett. The cast was completed by Alex Priat as Anthony, John Atkins as Judge Turpin, Carol Gizzard as Johanna, Sharian Wood as The Beggar Woman, Jack Leager as Beadle Bamford, Enrielos Hetares as Pirelli and Michael Greene & James Feldere who shared the role of Tobias.

2010 National Youth Music Theatre, London
In 2010, fifty members of the National Youth Music Theatre staged a production at the Village Underground as part of Stephen Sondheim's 80th birthday celebrations in London. NYMT took the show, directed by Martin Constantine, out of a conventional theatre space and staged it within a converted Victorian warehouse in the city's East End. The company revived the show in 2011 for the International Youth Arts Festival at the Rose Theatre in Kingston upon Thames.

2011 Paris production
A major new production opened in April 2011 at the Théâtre du Châtelet (Paris), which first gave Sondheim a place on the French stage with their production of A Little Night Music. The director was Lee Blakeley with choreography by Lorena Randi and designs by Tanya McAllin. The cast featured Rod Gilfry and Franco Pomponi (Sweeney Todd) and Caroline O'Connor (Mrs Lovett).

2014 Boston production
The Lyric Stage Company of Boston produced a run in September and October 2014 with the company's Artistic Director Spiro Veloudos staging and directing the show. The cast included Christopher Chew as Sweeney Todd and Amelia Broome as Mrs. Lovett.

2014 Quebec City production
Quebec City-based Théâtre Décibel produced the French-speaking world-premiere of the show. Translated by Joëlle Bond and directed by Louis Morin, the show played from October 28 to November 8, 2014 at the Capitole de Québec. The cast includes Renaud Paradis as Sweeney Todd, Katee Julien as Mrs. Lovett, Jean Petitclerc as Judge Turpin, Sabrina Ferland as the Beggar Woman, Pierre-Olivier Grondin as Anthony Hope, Andréane Bouladier as Johanna, David Noël as Tobias, Jonathan Gagnon as Beadle and Mathieu Samson as Pirelli.

2014 prog metal version, Landless Theatre Company, Washington, D.C.
Sondheim grants DC's Landless Theatre Company permission to orchestrate a "prog metal version" of Sweeney Todd, the first rock orchestration of the score. The production plays at DC's Warehouse Theatre in August 2014. Directed by Melissa Baughman. Music Direction by Charles W. Johnson. Prog Metal Orchestration by The Fleet Street Collective (Andrew Lloyd Baughman, Spencer Blevins, Charles Johnson, Lance LaRue, Ray Shaw, Alex Vallejo, Andrew Siddle). The cast features metal band front singers Nina Osegueda (A Sound of Thunder) as Mrs. Lovett, Andrew Lloyd Baughman (Diamond Dead) as Sweeney Todd, Rob Bradley (Aries and Thrillkiller) as Pirelli, and Irene Jericho (Cassandra Syndrome) as Beggar Woman. The show receives three 2015 Helen Hayes Awards nominations for Best Musical, Outstanding Director of a Musical (Melissa Baughman), and Outstanding Music Director (Charles W. Johnson).

2015 Welsh National Opera production
In autumn 2015 the Welsh National Opera and Wales Millennium Centre produced a co-production with West Yorkshire Playhouse and the Royal Exchange Manchester as part of the WNO's "Madness" season. Directed by James Brining and designed by Colin Richmond, the production was set in the 1970/80s, and was performed in Cardiff before touring to Southampton, Bristol, Llandudno, Oxford, Liverpool, Birmingham before returning to Cardiff. It was based on Brining's previous smaller productions from Dundee Rep in 2010, West Yorkshire Playhouse and Royal Exchange Manchester in 2013. The cast included David Arnsperger as Sweeney Todd and Janis Kelly as Mrs. Lovett.

2015 South African revival
Pieter Toerien and KickstArt produced a production at the Pieter Toerien Monte Casino Theatre in Johannesburg, which ran from October 10 – December 13, 2015 before transferring to the Theatre on the Bay in Cape Town from February 19 – April 9, 2016. Directed by Steven Stead and designed by Greg King, the production starred Jonathan Roxmouth (Sweeney Todd), Charon Williams-Ros (Mrs Lovett), Michael Richard (Judge Turpin), Jaco van Rensburg (Tobias), Anne Marie Clulow (Beggar Woman), Adam Pelkowitz (Beadle Bamford), Cameron Botha (Anthony), Sanli Jooste (Johanna), Germandt Geldenhuys (Adolfo Pirelli) and Weslee Swain Lauder (Jonas Fogg).

2015–2016 Australasia
In 2015, Victorian Opera's production was performed at the Melbourne Arts Centre. The production was revived for New Zealand Opera in 2016, visiting Auckland, Wellington and Christchurch.

The production starred Teddy Tahu Rhodes as Sweeney Todd, Antoinette Halloran as Mrs. Lovett, Phillip Rhodes as Judge Turpin, Kanen Breen as Beadle Bamford (later replaced by Andrew Glover during the New Zealand tour), David Rogers-Smith as Adolfo Pirelli (replaced by Robert Tucker in New Zealand), Ross Hannaford as Tobias Ragg (replaced by Joel Grainger in New Zealand), Blake Bowden as Anthony Hope (replaced James Benjamin Rodgers in New Zealand), Amelia Berry as Johanna, Dimity Shepherd as the Beggar Woman (replaced by Helen Medlyn in New Zealand), and Jeremy Kleeman as Jonas Fogg.

2018 Mexican production
Valtru produced the first Mexican production of Sweeney Todd. Opened on July 7, 2018, at the Foro Cultural Coyoacanense's starring Lupita Sandoval and Beto Torres along with José Andrés Mojica, Mario Beller, Eduardo Ibarra, Alejandra Desiderio, Sonia Monroy, Daniel Paéz and Adrian Mejia.

2019 Australia production
In June 2019, for the show's 40th anniversary, a limited run of the production presented by Life Like Company was performed at Her Majesty's Theatre, Melbourne and Darling Harbour Theatre, ICC Sydney. It starred Anthony Warlow as Sweeney Todd, Gina Riley as Mrs. Lovett, Debra Byrne as the Beggar Woman, Michael Falzon as Adolfo Pirelli, Jonathan Hickey as Tobias Ragg, and Daniel Sumegi as Judge Turpin.

2019 Philippines
Produced by Atlantis Theatrical Entertainment Group and directed by Bobby Garcia with musical direction by Gerard Salonga, it starred Jett Pangan as Sweeney Todd, Lea Salonga as Mrs. Lovett, Gerald Santos as Anthony Hope, Nyoy Volante as Adolfo Pirelli, Mikkie Bradshaw-Volante as Johanna, Ima Castro as the Beggar Woman, Andrew Fernando as Judge Turpin, Luigi Quesada as Tobias, Arman Ferrer as Beadle, and Dean Rosen as Jonas Fogg. The production debuted in October at The Theater at Solaire.

Opera house productions
The first opera company to mount Sweeney Todd was the Houston Grand Opera in a production directed by Hal Prince, which ran from June 14, 1984 through June 24, 1984 for a total of 10 performances. Conducted by John DeMain, the production used scenic designs by Eugene Lee, costume designs by Franne Lee, and lighting designs by Ken Billington. The cast included Timothy Nolen in the title role, Joyce Castle as Mrs. Lovett, Cris Groenendaal as Anthony, Lee Merrill as Johanna, Will Roy as Judge Turpin, and Barry Busse as The Beadle.

In 1984 the show was presented by the New York City Opera. Hal Prince recreated the staging using the simplified set of the 2nd national tour. It was well received and most performances sold out. It was brought back for limited runs in 1986 and 2004. Notably the 2004 production starred Mark Delavan and Elaine Paige. The show was also performed by Opera North in 1998 in the UK starring Steven Page and Beverley Klein, directed by David McVicar and conducted by James Holmes.

In the early 2000s, Sweeney Todd gained acceptance with opera companies throughout the United States, Canada, Japan, Germany, Israel, Spain, the Netherlands, the United Kingdom and Australia. Bryn Terfel, the popular Welsh bass-baritone, performed the title role at Lyric Opera of Chicago in 2002, with Judith Christian, David Cangelosi, Timothy Nolen, Bonaventura Bottone, Celena Shaffer and Nathan Gunn. It was performed at the Royal Opera House in London as part of the Royal Opera season (December 2003 – January 2004) starring Sir Thomas Allen as Todd, Felicity Palmer as Mrs. Lovett and a supporting cast that included Rosalind Plowright, Robert Tear and Jonathan Veira as Judge Turpin. The Finnish National Opera performed Sweeney Todd in 1997–98. The Israeli National Opera has performed Sweeney Todd twice. The Icelandic Opera performed Sweeney Todd in the fall of 2004, the first time in Iceland. On September 12, 2015, Sweeney Todd opened at the San Francisco Opera with Brian Mulligan as Todd, Stephanie Blythe as Mrs. Lovett, Matthew Grills as Tobias, Heidi Stober as Johanna, Elliot Madore as Anthony and Elizabeth Futral as the Beggar Woman/Lucy.

Concert productions
A "Reprise!" Concert version was performed at Los Angeles' Ahmanson Theatre on March 12–14, 1999 with Kelsey Grammer as Todd, Christine Baranski as Mrs. Lovett, Davis Gaines as Anthony, Neil Patrick Harris as Tobias, Melissa Manchester as The Beggar Woman, Roland Rusinek as The Beadle, Dale Kristien as Johanna and Ken Howard as Judge Turpin.

London's Royal Festival Hall hosted two performances on February 13, 2000, starring Len Cariou as Todd, Judy Kaye as Mrs. Lovett, and Davis Gaines as Anthony. A 4-day concert took place in July 2007 at the same venue with Bryn Terfel, Maria Friedman, Daniel Boys and Philip Quast.

Director Lonny Price directed a semi-staged concert production of "Sweeney Todd in Concert” on May 4–6, 2000 at Avery Fisher Hall at Lincoln Center, New York with the New York Philharmonic. The cast included George Hearn (a last-minute substitute for Bryn Terfel), Patti LuPone, Neil Patrick Harris, Davis Gaines, John Aler, Paul Plishka, Heidi Grant Murphy, Stanford Olsen and Audra McDonald. This concert also played in San Francisco, from July 19–21, 2001, with the San Francisco Symphony. Hearn and LuPone were joined once again by Harris, Gaines, Aler and Olsen as well as new additions Victoria Clark, Lisa Vroman and Timothy Nolen. This production was taped for PBS and broadcast in 2001, and won the Primetime Emmy Award for Outstanding Classical Music-Dance Program. The same production played at the Ravinia Festival in Chicago on August 24, 2001, with most of the cast from the preceding concerts, except for Plishka and Clark, who were replaced by Sherrill Milnes and Hollis Resnik.

In 2014, Price directed a new concert production, returning to Avery Fisher Hall with the New York Philharmonic on March 5–8 with Bryn Terfel as Todd, Emma Thompson as Mrs. Lovett, Philip Quast as Judge Turpin, Jeff Blumenkrantz as The Beadle, Christian Borle as Pirelli, Kyle Brenn as Tobias, Jay Armstrong Johnson as Anthony, Erin Mackey as Johanna and Audra McDonald and Bryonha Marie Parham sharing the role of The Beggar Woman. McDonald was not announced as the Beggar Woman: she was a surprise, her name only being revealed at the time of the first performance. On the Saturday performances, Bryonha Marie Parham played the role of the Beggar Woman, while McDonald played it at the other performances. The concert was again filmed for broadcast on PBS as part of their Live from Lincoln Center series and was first aired on September 26, 2014. The production was nominated for three Primetime Emmy Awards, winning one for Outstanding Special Class Program. This production transferred to London Coliseum Theatre for 13 performances from March 30 through April 12, 2015. The cast included original members like Terfel, Thompson and Quast, as well as new actors like John Owen-Jones and Rosalie Craig.

Film adaptation

A feature film adaptation of Sweeney Todd, directed by Tim Burton with a screenplay by John Logan, was released on December 21, 2007. It stars Johnny Depp as Todd (Depp received an Oscar nomination and a Golden Globe Award for his performance), Helena Bonham Carter as Mrs. Lovett, Alan Rickman as Judge Turpin, Sacha Baron Cohen as Signor Pirelli, Jamie Campbell Bower as Anthony Hope, Laura Michelle Kelly as The Beggar Woman, Jayne Wisener as Johanna, Ed Sanders as Toby, and Timothy Spall as Beadle Bamford. The film was well received by critics and theatregoers and also won the Golden Globe Award for Best Motion Picture – Musical or Comedy.

Themes
Stephen Sondheim believed that Sweeney Todd is a story of revenge and how it consumes a vengeful person. He asserted, "what the show is really about is obsession." Unlike most previous representations of the story, the musical avoids a simplistic view of devilish crimes. Instead, the characters’ “emotional and psychological depths” are examined, so that Sweeney Todd is understood as a victim as well as a perpetrator in the "great black pit" of humanity.

Musical analysis
Sondheim's score is one of his most complex, with orchestrations by his long-time collaborator Jonathan Tunick. Relying heavily on counterpoint and angular harmonies, its compositional style has been compared to Maurice Ravel, Sergei Prokofiev, and Bernard Herrmann. Sondheim also utilizes the ancient "Dies irae" in the ballad that runs throughout the score, later heard in a melodic inversion, and in the accompaniment to "Epiphany". According to Raymond Knapp, "Most scene changes bring back 'The Ballad of Sweeney Todd', which includes both fast and slow versions of the 'Dies Irae'". He also relies heavily on leitmotif – at least twenty distinct ones can be identified throughout the score.

Depending on how and where the show is presented, it is sometimes considered an opera. Sondheim himself has described the piece as a "black operetta", and indeed, only about 20% of the show is spoken; the rest is sung-through.

In his essay for the 2005 cast album, Jeremy Sams finds it most relevant to compare Sondheim's work with operas that similarly explore the psyche of a mad murderer or social outcast, such as Alban Berg's Wozzeck (1925, based on the play by Georg Büchner) and Benjamin Britten's Peter Grimes (1945). On the other hand, it can be seen as a precursor to the later trend of musicals based on horror themes, such as Little Shop of Horrors (1982), The Phantom of the Opera (1986), Jekyll & Hyde (1997) and Dance of the Vampires (1997), which used the description of the trend, "grusical", as its commercial label. Theatre critic and author Martin Gottfried wrote on this subject: "Does so much singing make it an opera? Opera is not just a matter of everything being sung. There is an operatic kind of music, of singing, of staging. There are opera audiences, and there is an opera sensibility. There are opera houses. Sweeney Todd has its occasional operatic moments, but its music overall has the chest notes, the harmonic language, the muscularity, and the edge of Broadway theater."

Donal Henahan wrote an essay in The New York Times concerning the 1984 New York City Opera production: "The difficulty with Sweeney was not that the opera singers were weaklings incapable of filling the State Theater with sound – Miss Elias, who was making her City Opera debut, has sung for many years at the Metropolitan, a far larger house. The other voices in the cast also were known quantities. Rather, it seemed to me that the attempt to actually sing the Sondheim score, which relies heavily on a dramatic parlando or speaking style, mainly showed how far from the operatic vocal tradition the work lies. The score, effective enough in its own way, demanded things of the opera singers that opera singers as a class are reluctant to produce."

Orchestration
The original Broadway pit consisted of a 26-piece orchestra. (The number of percussionists may vary for different shows, though the percussion book is written for two players).
 Strings: 6 violins, 2 violas, 2 cellos, 1 double bass, 1 harp
 Brass: 2 trumpets, 1 French horn, 2 trombones, 1 bass trombone
 Keyboards: 1 organ/celesta
 Woodwinds:
 Reed 1: flute, piccolo, optional soprano and alto recorders
 Reed 2: B and E clarinet, flute, piccolo
 Reed 3: bass clarinet, B clarinet
 Reed 4: oboe, English horn
 Reed 5: bassoon
 Percussion: (2 players) 3 timpani, bass drum, xylophone, vibraphone, snare drum, tom toms, bass drum with pedal, orchestra bells, tam-tam, chimes, 4 suspended cymbals, wood block, crash cymbals, bell tree, tambourine, washtub

An alternate orchestration is available from Music Theatre International for a 9 piece orchestra. It was written by Jonathan Tunick for the 1993 London Production.
 Strings: 1 violin, 1 cello, 1 double bass
 Brass: 1 trumpet in B, 1 French horn
 Woodwinds: Reed 1: clarinet; Reed 2: bassoon
 Keyboard
 Percussion: bass drum, bell tree, bells, chimes, crotales, rachet, side drum, snare drum, Swiss bell, tam-tam, tambourine, temple blocks, triangle, timpani, vibraphone, whistle, wood block, xylophone

Original orchestrator Jonathan Tunick revised his large orchestration for the 1993 London revival, adding a dirtier, grittier texture to the score's arrangements.

2012 London revival: 15 piece orchestra:
 Strings: 2 violins, 1 viola, 1 cello, 1 double bass
 Brass: 1 French horn, 2 trumpets, 1 trombone
 Woodwinds:
 Reed 1: flute, clarinet
 Reed 2: oboe, English horn
 Reed 3: clarinet
 Reed 4: bassoon
 Keyboard
 Percussion

Awards and nominations

Original Broadway production

Original London production

1989 Broadway revival

1993 London revival

2005 London revival

2005 Broadway revival

2012 London revival

Recordings and broadcasts
An original Broadway cast recording was released by RCA Red Seal in 1979. It included the Judge's "Johanna" and the tooth-pulling contest from Act I, which had been cut in previews. It was selected by the National Recording Registry for preservation in 2013.

A performance of the 1980 touring company was taped before an audience in 1981 at the Dorothy Chandler Pavilion in Los Angeles during the first national tour, with additional taping done in an empty theatre for a television special. The resulting program was televised on September 12, 1982, on The Entertainment Channel. It was later released on both VHS and DVD.

On 2 July 1994, the Royal National Theatre revival production starring Denis Quilley and Julia McKenzie was broadcast by the BBC. Opera North's production was also broadcast by the BBC on March 30, 1998 as was the Royal Opera House production in 2003.

In 1995, the Barcelona cast recorded a cast album sung in Catalan. This production was also broadcast on Spanish television.

The 2000 New York City Concert was recorded and released in a deluxe 2-CD set. This recording was nominated for the Grammy Award for Best Musical Show Album.

In 2001, the same concert was held in San Francisco with the same leads and minor cast changes. It was also videotaped and broadcast on PBS, and then was released to VHS and DVD in 2001.

The 2005 Broadway revival also was recorded. The producers originally planned only a single-disk "highlights" version; however, they soon realized that they had recorded more music than could fit on one disk and it was not financially feasible to bring the performers back in to re-record. The following songs were cut: "Wigmaker Sequence", "The Letter", "Parlor Songs", "City on Fire", and half of the final sequence (which includes "The Judge's Return"). This recording was nominated for the Grammy Award for Best Musical Show Album.

The 2012 London revival was recorded and released on April 2, 2012 in the UK and April 10, 2012 in the United States.

References

External links

 Sweeney Todd on the Internet Broadway Database
 Sweeney Todd on The Stephen Sondheim Reference Guide
 Sweeney Todd at Sondheim.com
 Sweeney Todd at the Music Theatre International website
 Sweeney Todd: School Edition at the Music Theatre International website
 Sweeney Todd Music Theatre Warwick's 2008 production
Stephen Sondheim "The Story So Far" podcast series produced by Sony BMG Masterworks

Sweeney Todd
1979 musicals
Broadway musicals
West End musicals
Laurence Olivier Award-winning musicals
Drama Desk Award-winning musicals
Musicals based on secular traditions
Musicals based on plays
Fiction set in 1846
Plays set in the 19th century
Musicals set in London
Uxoricide in fiction
Musicals by Hugh Wheeler
Musicals by Stephen Sondheim
Tony Award for Best Musical
United States National Recording Registry recordings
Wrongful convictions in fiction
Tony Award-winning musicals
Rape in fiction
Sung-through musicals